Ricardo "La Changa" Álvarez was a Mexican former Primera División (First Division) player who started his career playing in the amateur league in the 1930s with club Moctezuma de Orizaba. He later transferred to Puebla FC where he played 120 games over 5 years and scored 87 goals, and is remembered as a club icon. In 1950 he left to play for Veracruz where he played for a couple months before retiring. He scored 113 goals in his career.

Club achievements

Achievements

See also 
Moctezuma de Orizaba
Puebla FC
Tiburones Rojos de Veracruz

References 

Year of birth missing
Possibly living people
20th-century Mexican people
Footballers from Veracruz
Mexican footballers
Club Puebla players
C.D. Veracruz footballers
Association football forwards